This is a list of recurring characters from the Bernice Summerfield stories, both the original Virgin New Adventures featuring Bernice and the subsequent and ongoing series of audio dramas and novels by Big Finish Productions. Bernice Summerfield was a companion of the Doctor in the New Adventures, a series of books based on the long-running BBC science fiction television series Doctor Who, but which latterly became based around the character of Bernice.

B

Irving Braxiatel

C

Clarence

Clarence is an artificial intelligence from the People. The character was created and introduced by Simon Bucher-Jones for Ghost Devices in which Clarence appears in the form of an angel (he is named after the angel in It's a Wonderful Life) to Benny. Clarence is an agent of God, the artificial intelligence that controls the People's Dyson sphere and is eventually revealed (in Tears of the Oracle) to be a character from The Also People.

G

God

God is the super-advanced artificial intelligence controlling the People's Dyson sphere. The character was introduced by Ben Aaronovitch in The Also People and became a frequently recurring character in the later New Adventures based around Bernice. On several occasions, God sought to use Bernice as his agent, often sending his emissary Clarence to visit her.

J

Joseph
Joseph is Bernice Summerfield's robotic secretary. He appears in several Bernice stories across the Virgin New Adventures and Big Finish's Bernice stories.

K

Jason Kane

L

John Lafayette

John Lafayette (from Walking to Babylon) was a Victorian translator who was exploring the ruins of Babylon. There, he stumbled across a time corridor and was drawn back in time to the city in ancient times. There he met with Bernice who was seeking out renegade members of the People and Jason, and becomes romantically involved with her.

Lafayette also appears in the audio play Birthright, although he had not appeared in the New Adventure on which it was based.

M

Emile Mars-Smith

Emile Mars-Smith was introduced in Matthew Jones's novel Beyond the Sun in 1997. Beyond the Sun was adapted into an audio drama by Big Finish Productions, in which Emile was portrayed by Lewis Davis.

Emile was brought up by a strict religious father, and at the age of fifteen ran away to St. Oscar's University on the planet Dellah. Emile was one of Benny's students at St. Oscar's, and she took him on a field trip to the planet Apollox 4 where they became entangled with an alien species known as the Sunless. During the adventure, Emile finds himself attracted to another man, and realises he is gay.

Ronan McGinley

Ronan McGinley is an office worker from the early 21st Century. One day, while having a cigarette, he meets Irving Braxiatel who promises him one summer of adventure. Braxiatel brings McGinley to the Collection and instigates a romance between him and Clarissa Jones. She is still mourning the loss of her lover, Bernard Moskoff, who was killed during the events of Death and the Daleks. Clarissa enjoys her time with Ronan but is also suspicious as to his past. Investigating, she finds evidence (planted by Braxiatel) that he was a Fifth Axis soldier. She asks him to leave the Collection but, unknown to her, he meets with Braxiatel who tells him that the one good summer he promised is over.
Then, a year later, Jason Kane finds McGinley on the planet Cantus. Braxiatel has connected the man to an army of Cybermen in order to keep them under control. During the events of this story, McGinley dies.
In the audio drama The Crystal of Cantus, McGinley is portrayed by Nicholas Briggs.

P

Parasiel

Parasiel is a student on the Braxiatel Collection. When he first arrives, shortly after the end of the Fifth Axis Occupation, his lack of social skills means he is not particularly popular. As he spends more time on the Collection, his behaviour softens a little, and he has a series of affairs with female students. Bernice tells him about the events of The Goddess Quandary and then The Crystal of Cantus. During the second of these adventures, he also has his memory erased by Irving Braxiatel. He left the Collection in Collected Works after one of his love affairs ended tragically; though he says he might return, Benny doubts she'll see him again.

S

Admiral Isaac Summerfield

Admiral Isaac Douglas Summerfield is the father of Bernice. A high-ranking officer in space fleet, he went to fight against the Daleks and never returned to his wife and child. Bernice never gave up hope that he could still be alive, and was eventually rewarded when she found him on Earth in 1983. It was revealed in Kate Orman's novel Return of the Living Dad that, during a battle at Bellatrix, the Admiral's ship had been drawn into a worm hole which deposited him back in time to 1963. There he organised a resistance cell to fight the Daleks. 20 years later, Bernice managed to locate him in the village of Little Caldwell. The Admiral was running an underground network helping stranded aliens to leave Earth. He always worried that he would be discovered and shut down by the Doctor.

However, he also had a more sinister plan to detonate a nuclear device on Earth. This would trigger an arms-race that could lead to the development of weapons capable of defeating the Daleks when they tried to invade Earth in the 22nd century. However, the alien he was conspiring with was revealed to be a Dalek agent, and was uncovered by the Doctor. Managing to forgive her father for his manipulation, Bernice teamed up with him and the Doctor and used a missile to destroy a Dalek spy satellite.

In the audio drama Death and the Daleks, Summerfield is portrayed by Ian Collier, who voiced Omega in Arc of Infinity and Omega.

Christine Summerfield / Cousin Eliza

Narrator of the standalone novel Dead Romance, which did not feature Bernice.
Christine found out her entire world was a bottle universe being used by Time Lords as a bolt hole to escape the Gods. During the course of the novel she began a relationship with Chris Cwej and helped him to prepare the bottle for the arrival of the Time Lords.
After learning of Bernice Summerfield she became fascinated by her and her history convinced there was a connection between them.
The novel ended with her being betrayed by Cwej and deciding to leave the bottle for the "real" universe, she eventually ended up on a Gallifrey in ruins, writing her story which she left among the ruins.
The last entry of Dead Romance states that she believed that the "real" universe was just a bigger bottle within bigger and bigger bottles; and maybe she could keep traveling upwards through the different bottles until she found the real universe. However she did not seem to achieve this goal as she sent a letter to Bernice in Twilight of the Gods where it is stated that she took a post at a university on the planet Vremnya.
Some point after this she was initiated into Faction Paradox where she adopted the title, Cousin Eliza, and is subsequently quoted in The Book of the War; she is one of the central characters in the Faction Paradox audio dramas.

Peter Summerfield

Peter Guy Summerfield is the son of Bernice and Adrian Wall. His middle name Guy was in honour of Sir Guy de Carnac, a man with whom Benny fell in love in the novel Sanctuary but who then apparently died. The circumstances of his conception were unusual because Benny was being controlled by an alien sorceress. Peter appeared the audio drama, The Grel Escape, in which he was voiced by Dacey Warriner and The Crystal of Cantus in which he was voiced by Thomas Grant.

T

Bev Tarrant

W

Adrian Wall

Adrian Wall is a Killoran construction worker for the Braxiatel collection. Killorans are a species who resemble a cross between a wolf and an ape, and Adrian was seven feet tall with huge claws and fangs. He took his name from Hadrian's Wall, in preference to his native Killoran name, after studying the Roman emperor

During the events of The Squire's Crystal, Bernice was possessed by an alien sorceress. Whilst possessed she became impregnated by Adrian, and later gave birth to a baby boy whom she named Peter.

The Killorans appear in the Doctor Who audio plays Arrangements for War (where they invade the planet Világ) and its sequel Thicker than Water. The novella Hiding Places by Stewart Sheargold, published in the anthology Parallel Lives, reveals that Adrian was present on Világ.

Wolsey

Characters
Bernice Summerfield characters
Bernice Summerfield characters
Bernice Summerfield characters